Hans Pochon (1900–1977) was a Swiss entomologist and an authority on Buprestidae beetles.

From 1931 he worked at the Musee d'histoire naturelle in Fribourg and restructured its entomological collections. As the museum did not have a collection of local Coleoptera, he donated his own collection. During his career he gathered some 16 000 specimens of Buprestidae, many of species new to science.

Publications
Coleoptera - Buprestidae (Volume 2 of Insecta helvetica) - Hans Pochon (Schweizerische Entomologische Gesellschaft, 1964)
Buprestidae collection from Catalonia

References

Swiss entomologists
1900 births
1977 deaths
20th-century Swiss zoologists